Acalolepta artia is a species of beetle with a bilateral symmetry in the family Cerambycidae. It was described by Olliff in 1890, originally under the genus Monochamus. It is known from Australia.

References

Acalolepta
Beetles described in 1890